Ethan B. Minier (September 1, 1874 – December 29, 1958) was an American farmer, teacher, lawyer, and politician.

Born in Ulster, Pennsylvania, Minier moved with his parents in 1887 to a farm near New Richmond, Wisconsin. Minier taught school and then graduated from the University of Minnesota Law School. He practiced law in Amery, Wisconsin and was also had a farm near New Richmond, Wisconsin. From 1924 to 1927, Minier served in the Wisconsin State Assembly and was a Republican. Minier died in New Richmond, Wisconsin at the age of 84 in 1958.

Notes

1874 births
1958 deaths
People from Bradford County, Pennsylvania
People from New Richmond, Wisconsin
University of Minnesota Law School alumni
Educators from Wisconsin
Farmers from Wisconsin
Wisconsin lawyers
People from Amery, Wisconsin
Educators from Pennsylvania
Republican Party members of the Wisconsin State Assembly